USS Chemung (AO-30), a  fleet replenishment oiler serving in the United States Navy, was the second ship named for the Chemung River in New York State.

Chemung was launched 9 September 1939 as Esso Annapolis by Bethlehem Shipbuilding Corporation at Bethlehem Sparrows Point Shipyard, Sparrows Point, Maryland, under a Maritime Commission contract; sponsored by Miss Howard; acquired by the Navy 5 June 1941; and commissioned 3 July 1941.

From 13 July 1941 until the entry of the United States into World War II, Chemung operated between east coast ports and the oil ports of Texas and Louisiana transporting fuel oil.

World War II
From 20 December 1941 to 3 January 1942 she issued fuel at NS Argentia, Newfoundland. Reloading at Norfolk, Virginia, she steamed to Hvalfjörður, Iceland carrying fuel (19 February–25 March), then operated between Norfolk and ports in the Gulf of Mexico from 1 April to 16 May. Following another tour as fuel station ship at Hvalfjörður (30 May–26 June), Chemung departed from New York City 20 August with a convoy bound for the United Kingdom. Two days later  collided with her at night. The destroyer sank almost immediately when the depth charges on her stern exploded. Chemung, although heavily damaged by the explosion and resulting fires, reached Boston, Massachusetts 26 August for repairs.

Steaming 1 October 1942 to Beaumont, Texas, to load fuel, Chemung accompanied the North African assault force to sea, remained off the coast during the landings, then returned to Norfolk 30 November to resume coastwise fuel runs. From 15 February 1943 to 11 June 1945 Chemung alternated five convoy voyages to United Kingdom ports and five to North Africa with coast-wise and Caribbean cargo duty and station duty at Bermuda and in the Azores.

Post-war service
An assignment to occupation duty in the Far East found Chemung circumnavigating the globe as she cleared Norfolk 18 July 1945, passed through the Panama Canal for service at Okinawa 17 September to 13 October, and returned by way of the Cape of Good Hope to Norfolk 6 December. She operated with the US Atlantic Fleet, serving the US 6th Fleet in the Mediterranean (12 November 1948—1 April 1949), until 17 March 1950, when she sailed for San Diego, where she was decommissioned and placed in reserve 3 July 1950.

Recommissioned 1 December 1950, Chemung steamed to the Far East 28 January 1951 for a brief tour refueling forces engaged in the Korean War. During her second tour of duty (7 July 1951—20 April 1952), she supported United Nations troops in Korea, served on the Formosa Patrol, then transported oil from Ras Tanura, Arabia, to Guam. She again sailed from San Pedro 24 June 1952 to support the US 7th Fleet off Korea until returning to Mare Island for overhaul on 24 February.

In nine succeeding tours of duty in the Western Pacific from her home port at San Pedro California between 1953 and 1960, Chemung supported many of the 7th Fleet's most notable contributions to the keeping of peace in the Far East. During her 1954—1955 tour she provided fuel for the ships carrying out the evacuation of the Tachen Islands. During each of the tours she has served as station tanker at Kaohsiung, Taiwan, fueling the ships of the Taiwan Patrol.

Chemung served through the 1960s, including service in support of the Vietnam War, until she was decommissioned on 18 September 1970. She was transferred to the Maritime Administration and scrapped in May 1971.

Chemung received two battle stars for World War II service, and four for service in the Korean War.

References

External links 
navsource.org: USS Chemung
hazegray.org: USS Chemung

Cimarron-class oilers (1939)
Ships built in Sparrows Point, Maryland
1939 ships
World War II auxiliary ships of the United States
World War II tankers of the United States
Korean War auxiliary ships of the United States
Cold War auxiliary ships of the United States
Vietnam War auxiliary ships of the United States
Maritime incidents in August 1942